KIBN-LD, virtual and UHF digital channel 14, is a low-powered IBN Television-affiliated television station licensed to Lufkin, Texas, United States. Originally founded in 1989 by IBN (International Broadcasting Network), it is now owned by Edge Spectrum.

Digital channels
The station's digital signal is multiplexed:

References

External links

IBN-LD
Television channels and stations established in 1989
Low-power television stations in the United States